David Tomlinson (1917–2000) was an English film actor and comedian.

David or Dave Tomlinson may also refer to:

 Dave Tomlinson (born 1969), ice hockey player
 Dave Tomlinson (Canadian football) (1926–2005), Canadian football player
 Dave Formula (born 1946), stage name of English musician David Tomlinson